"I Still Do" is a song by Bill Medley from the album of the same name. Among his country music singles, this one charted the highest, reaching #17 on the Billboard Hot Country Songs chart. The song is described as being part of Medley's shift into country music. The song moved into the adult contemporary charts becoming a "cult" hit with the Carolina Beach/Shag dance club circuit.

Premise
The song involves Medley addressing his wife, stating that despite all of the challenges that life has thrown in the way of the couple, that Medley is still committed to the marriage to which he agreed many years before.

Charts

References

1984 singles
1984 songs
Bill Medley songs
RCA Records singles
Songs written by John Jarrard
Song recordings produced by Jerry Crutchfield
Songs written by J. D. Martin (songwriter)